Nonny is a given name. Notable people with the name include:

 Nonny Hogrogian (born 1932), Armenian-American writer and illustrator
 Nonny de la Peña, American pioneer in virtual reality
 Nonny, a character from the American animated television series Bubble Guppies.

See also
 Noni (disambiguation)
 Nonnie